Hubbard Creek is a river that flows through Callahan, Shackelford and Stephens counties in Texas.

The creek rises three miles north of Baird, flowing sixty-two miles northeast, through Shackelford County before meeting the Clear Fork of the Brazos River ten miles north of  Breckenridge.

See also
List of rivers of Texas

References

Rivers of Texas
Callahan County, Texas
Shackelford County, Texas 
Stephens County, Texas